The 2002 Coca-Cola Racing Family 600, the 43rd running of the event, was a NASCAR Winston Cup Series race held on May 26, 2002 at Lowe's Motor Speedway in Charlotte, North Carolina. Contested at 400 laps on the 1.5 mile (2.4 km) speedway, it was the twelfth race of the 2002 NASCAR Winston Cup Series season. Mark Martin of Roush Racing won the race. A record 4 in a row for Roush Racing. Matt Kenseth finished second and Ricky Craven finished third.

Failed to qualify: Chad Little ( 74), Carl Long (No. 85), Derrike Cope (No. 37), Randy Renfrow (No. 59)

Background

Lowe's Motor Speedway is a motorsports complex located in Concord, North Carolina, United States 13 miles from Charlotte, North Carolina. The complex features a 1.5 miles (2.4 km) quad oval track that hosts NASCAR racing including the prestigious Coca-Cola 600 on Memorial Day weekend and The Winston, as well as the UAW-GM Quality 500. The speedway was built in 1959 by Bruton Smith and is considered the home track for NASCAR with many race teams located in the Charlotte area. The track is owned and operated by Speedway Motorsports Inc. (SMI) with Humpy Wheeler as track president.

Entry list

Qualifying

Race results

Race statistics
 Time of race: 4:21:23
 Average Speed: 
 Pole Speed: 186.464
 Cautions: 9 for 48 laps
 Margin of Victory: 0.468 sec
 Lead changes: 21
 Percent of race run under caution: 12%
 Average green flag run: 35.2 laps

References

Coca-Cola Racing Family 600
Coca-Cola Racing Family 600
NASCAR races at Charlotte Motor Speedway